Bel Air or Bel-Air may refer to:

Places

France 

 Bastide Bel-Air, a historic, listed building in Aix-en-Provence, France
 Bel-Air (Paris Métro), a station of the Paris Métro

Haiti 

 Bel Air, Haiti, a neighborhood of Port-au-Prince

United States 

 Bel Air, Los Angeles, a neighborhood of the city of Los Angeles, California
 Hotel Bel-Air, a hotel located in Bel-Air, Los Angeles, California
 Bel Air, Allegany County, Maryland, an unincorporated place in Maryland
 Bel Air, Harford County, Maryland, town and county seat in Maryland
 Bel Air North, Maryland, a census-designated place in Maryland
 Bel Air South, Maryland, a census-designated place in Maryland
 Bel Air (Minnieville, Virginia), a historic plantation in Prince William County, Virginia
 Bel Air, Minot, a neighborhood in Minot, North Dakota
 Bel-Air (Sanford), a placename in Seminole County, Florida

Other places 

 Bel Air, Seychelles
 Residence Bel-Air, a development in Hong Kong
 Bel-Air, Makati, a gated community in the Philippines

Brands and companies 

 Bel-Air Athletics, a clothing brand founded by Will Smith
 Bel Air Circuit, an exclusive home movie club
 Chevrolet Bel Air, a car
 Bel Air Markets, a trading name for the Raley's Supermarkets chain in the western US

Media and entertainment 

 Bel Air (album) (2011), by Guano Apes
 "Bel Air ~Kuuhaku no Shunkan no Naka De~", song by Malice Mizer
 "Bel Air" (song), by Lana Del Rey from her extended play album Paradise
 "Bel Air", song by The Church (band)
 "Bel Air", song by the German band Can, on the album Future Days
 The Fresh Prince of Bel-Air, a US sitcom TV series
 Bel-Air (film), a 2019 short film based on the 1990s sitcom
Bel-Air (TV series), a reboot of the 1990s sitcom based on the 2019 short film
 Bel Air (sometimes Bel-Air), a French record label in existence 1956–64/65.

Schools 

 Bel Air High School (El Paso, Texas)
 Bel Air High School (Harford County, Maryland)

See also 

 Bel-Aire (disambiguation)
 Belair (disambiguation)
 Bellaire (disambiguation)
 Belleair (disambiguation)